The 2013 Cork Junior Hurling Championship was the 116th staging of the Cork Junior Hurling Championship since its establishment by the Cork County Board in 1895. The championship began on 7 September 2013 and ended on 10 November 2013.

On 10 November 2013, Grenagh won the championship following a 1-10 to 2-05 defeat of Kilbrin in the final at Páirc Uí Rinn. This was their first championship title in the grade.

Grenagh's Tom Kenny was the championship's top scorer with 1-17.

Qualification

Results

First round

Semi-final

Final

Championship statistics

Top scorers

Overall

In a single game

References

External link

 2013 Cork JAHC results

Cork Junior Hurling Championship
Cork Junior Hurling Championship